The All-Ireland Senior B Hurling Championship of 1991 was the 18th staging of Ireland's secondary hurling knock-out competition.  Westmeath won the championship, beating London 2-12 to 2-6 in the final at Cusack Park, Mullingar.

References

 Donegan, Des, The Complete Handbook of Gaelic Games (DBA Publications Limited, 2005).

1991
B